Hal Finney may refer to:
Hal Finney (baseball) (1905–1991), Major League Baseball catcher
Hal Finney (computer scientist) (1956–2014), game developer and cryptographer